Liu Shuai (Chinese: 刘帅; born 2 April 1989 in Anhui) is a Chinese football player who currently plays for China League Two side Shenzhen Ledman.

Club career
In 2009, Liu Shuai started his professional footballer career with Shenzhen Ruby in the Chinese Super League. He would eventually make his league debut for Shenzhen on 23 October 2010 in a game against Tianjin Teda.
In 2012, he was loaned to China League Two side Shenzhen Main Sports until 31 December.

In March 2017, Liu transferred to League Two side Shanghai Sunfun.
In March 2018, Liu transferred to Shenzhen Ledman.

Career statistics 
Statistics accurate as of match played 13 October 2018.

References

1989 births
Living people
Chinese footballers
Footballers from Anhui
Shenzhen F.C. players
Chinese Super League players
China League One players
Association football defenders